Margaret Jones (1613 – June 15, 1648) was the first person to be executed for witchcraft in Massachusetts Bay Colony  during a witch-hunt that lasted from 1648 to 1693. About eighty people throughout New England were accused of practicing witchcraft during that period. Thirteen women and two men were executed. 

Jones, who resided in Charlestown, now a section of Boston, was a midwife and practiced medicine. Some of what caused her to be accused of witchcraft had to do with these practices. There are only two primary sources of information on Jones' plight: Governor John Winthrop's journal and the observations of minister John Hale, who, as a 12-year-old boy, had witnessed Jones' execution.

Trial and conviction
John Winthrop, as governor, and several other founders of the Massachusetts Bay Colony were among the members of the General Court which tried and convicted Margaret Jones for witchcraft. The others included deputy governor Thomas Dudley and assistant governors John Endicott, Richard Bellingham,  William Hibbins, Increase Nowell, Simon Bradstreet, John Winthrop, Jr., and William Pynchon. Ann Hibbins, who was executed for witchcraft in 1656, was reputed to be the sister of Richard Bellingham, and was the widow of William Hibbins. William Hibbins was succeeded as assistant by Humphrey Atherton, who sat in judgment of Ann Hibbins.

Winthrop's journal does not reveal anything specific about what caused the accusations against Jones, or her husband, Thomas, who was also accused but not convicted. The case against her was built on evidence collected using the methods of English Witchfinder General, Matthew Hopkins. Hopkins manual on witch-hunting was published one year before Jones' conviction, in which Hopkins prescribed the practice of "watching" which required the accused to sit in a specific position, usually with legs crossed for a period of twenty four hours, during which she or he would be observed. If the person was a witch, it was supposed that within twenty four hours an imp would appear to feed off the witch.  An imp was a small creature, or familiar, who depended upon the witch for daily sustenance. The watching of Margaret Jones occurred on May 18, 1648 and Winthrop recorded an imp was seen "In the clear light of day."

Winthrop recorded the evidence used to convict Jones in his journal:
"June 15, 1648: At this court, one Margaret Jones, of Charlestown, was indicted and found guilty of witchcraft, and hanged for it. The evidence against her was:
" 1. That she was found to have such a malignant touch, as many persons, men, women, and children, whom she stroked or touched with any affection or displeasure, or etc. [sic], were taken with deafness, or vomiting, or other violent pains or sickness. "

" 2. She practising physic, and her medicines being such things as, by her own confession, were harmless, — as anise-seed, liquors, etc., — yet had extraordinary violent effects. "

" 3. She would use to tell such as would not make use of her physic, that they would never be healed; and accordingly their diseases and hurts continued, with relapse against the ordinary course, and beyond the apprehension of all physicians and surgeons. "

" 4. Some things which she foretold came to pass accordingly; other things she would tell of, as secret speeches, etc., which she had no ordinary means to come to the knowledge of. "

" 5. She had, upon search, an apparent teat ... as fresh as if it had been newly sucked; and after it had been scanned, upon a forced search, that was withered, and another began on the opposite side. "

" 6. In the prison, in the clear day-light, there was seen in her arms, she sitting on the floor, and her clothes up, etc., a little child, which ran from her into another room, and the officer following it, it was vanished. The like child was seen in two other places to which she had relation; and one maid that saw it, fell sick upon it, and was cured by the said Margaret, who used means to be employed to that end. Her behavior at her trial was very intemperate, lying notoriously, and railing upon the jury and witnesses, etc., and in the like distemper she died. The same day and hour she was executed, there was a very great tempest at Connecticut, which blew down many trees, etc." "

Witness to the execution
John Hale, who was born in Charlestown, was 12 years old when he, along with other neighbors of Jones, visited her in prison on the day of her execution. He said in his writing, Modest Inquiry p. 17, that part of the reason for the charges being brought upon the condemned woman was that after she had quarreled with some neighbors, "some mischief befell" some of their cattle.

As an adult and a minister, Hale was an active participant in the bringing of charges in the Salem witch trials, but had afterwards had a change of heart.  Accusations of witchcraft against Rev. Hale's wife helped to bring an end to the proceedings. The accusers, in aiming at such characters, overestimated their power; and the tide began to turn against them. But what finally broke the spell by which they had held the minds of the whole colony in bondage was their accusation, in October, of Mrs. Hale, the wife of the minister of the First Church in Beverly. Her genuine and distinguished virtues had won for her a reputation, and secured in the hearts of the people a confidence, which superstition itself could not sully nor shake. Mr. Hale had been active in all the previous proceedings; but he knew the innocence and piety of his wife, and he stood forth between her and the storm he had helped to raise: although he had driven it on while others were its victims, he turned and- resisted it when it burst in upon his own dwelling.

Thomas Jones
After Jones was put to death, her husband, Thomas, who had been released from prison, tried to leave the colony on the ship, Welcome. However the ship, which had a heavy load of cargo, had trouble keeping its balance in fair weather. When it was realized that the husband of a condemned witch was on board and he had quarreled with the captain, Thomas was arrested and put back in prison. Upon his arrest, it was claimed, the ship immediately righted itself.

Other people executed for witchcraft in New England
Historian Clarence F. Jewett included a list of other people executed in New England in The Memorial History of Boston: Including Suffolk County, Massachusetts 1630–1880 (Ticknor and Company, 1881). He wrote, The following is the list of the twelve persons who were executed for witchcraft in New England before 1692, when twenty other persons were executed at Salem, whose names are well known. It is possible that the list is not complete ; but I have included all of which I have any knowledge, and with such details as to names and dates as could be ascertained : —
 1647, — "Woman of Windsor", Connecticut (name unknown) [later identified as Alice Young], at Hartford. 
 1648, — Margaret Jones, of Charlestown, at Boston.
 1648,— Mary Johnson, at Hartford.
 1650? — Henry Lake's wife, of Dorchester.
 1650?—Mrs. Kendall, of Cambridge.
 1651, — Mary Parsons, of Springfield, at Boston.
 1651, — Goodwife Bassett, at Fairfield, Conn.
 1653, — Goodwife Knap, at Hartford.
 1656, — Ann Hibbins, at Boston.
 1662, — Goodman Greensmith, at Hartford.
 1662,— Goodwife Greensmith, at Hartford.
 1688,— Goody Glover, at Boston."

Mary (Bliss) Parsons of Springfield (and later Northampton) was accused of witchcraft, acquitted of the crime and not executed.  But Mary (Lewis) Parsons of Springfield (apparently not a direct relation to the other Mary Parsons) was convicted of infanticide and sentenced to hang; there is no record of her execution, and it is believed that she died in prison.

See also
List of people executed for witchcraft

References

1613 births
1648 deaths
American people executed for witchcraft
17th-century executions of American people
People executed by the Massachusetts Bay Colony
People from colonial Boston
American folklore
American midwives